Oria may refer to:

Places

Italy
 Oria, Apulia, a town in the Apulia region, Province of Brindisi
 Oria, Lombardy, a village in the municipality of Valsolda, in the Province of Como

Spain
 Oria, Spain, a municipality in the Province of Almería, Andalusia
 Oria (river), a river in the Province of Gipuzkoa, Basque Country
 Former village and industrial centre in Lasarte-Oria by the river Oria, Gipuzkoa, Basque Country

People
 Auria, called Oria in Spanish, queen of Pamplona in the 10th century
 In Greek mythology, Oria (Ὀρεία), was a daughter of Thespis and Megamede, and mother of Laomenes.

 Surname
Ángel Herrera Oria (1886–1968),Spanish journalist and Roman Catholic politician and later a cardinal
Shelly Oria, Israeli-American author

Other uses
 Odia language or Oriya, predominantly used in the Indian state of Odisha
 Oria (moth), a genus of noctuid moths
 SS Oria, three steamships named Oria

See also 
 Orya (disambiguation)
 Aurea (disambiguation)
 Auria (disambiguation)